Tailpin can refer to:

 Endpin (also known as spike) of a cello or bass
 The pin or button to which a tailpiece of a string instrument is attached